is a Japanese global logistics services company. It is based in Tokyo and is owned by Nippon Express Holdings.

Its shareholding is dominated by banks and financial institutions mostly related to the Mizuho (Mizuho Financial Group) and Sumitomo Mitsui (SMFG) Keiretsus.

In Japan it is commonly known as 'Nittsu', and some of Nippon Express subsidiaries include 'Nittsu' in their names.

History

The company was established in 1937 in line with the Nippon Tsu-un Kaisha Law as a semi-government transportation service by pooling the assets of Kokusai Tsu-un KK (International Express Co., Ltd.), which consolidated many of the nation's small-scale rail transport companies, and six other competitors, with additional funding from the Japanese government. After more than a decade of operation the company was fully privatized in the 1950s.

Activities

In 2017, Nippon Express annual revenues exceeded  US$16 billion, making it one of the top five global logistics services providers. Nippon Express has a strong global network that spans over 40 countries, with company direct operations in 33 nations.

At the end of 2013 Nippon Express Co Ltd bought 67 percent of Panasonic Logistics which is owned by Japanese electronics group Panasonic Corp.

Nippon Express indicated in September 2017 to plan to raise 100 billion yen ($912 million) in debt capital over two years to consolidate several warehouses in the Tokyo, Osaka and Nagoya regions and install labor-saving equipment, and to build transit warehouses in overseas locations, such as Thailand, Malaysia and Indonesia, taking advantage of low interest rates to cope with a deepening shortage of workers (source: Nikkei and Reuters).

References

External links
 
 Official Website (Japanese)
 Nippon Express USA
 "Snapshot for Nippon Express Co Ltd (9062)," Bloomberg.

Transport companies based in Tokyo
Logistics companies of Japan
Service companies based in Tokyo
Transport companies established in 1937
Japanese brands
Business services companies established in 1937
1937 establishments in Japan
Companies listed on the Tokyo Stock Exchange